Ji Lin (born April 1962) is a Chinese politician, currently serving as the Chairman of the Beijing Committee of the Chinese People's Political Consultative Conference.

Born in Shanghai, Ji graduated from Renmin University of China school of law, specializing in criminal law. He joined the Chinese Communist Party in July 1987. After graduating, he became a functionary with the Communist Youth League, eventually leading the organization's arm at his alma mater. In August 1994 he was named deputy Communist Youth League Secretary of Beijing, promoted a year later to Secretary. In October 1998, he took on the post of party chief of Miyun County. In June 2002 he was named head of the Political and Legal Affairs Commission of Beijing and a member of the municipal Party Standing Committee, ascending to sub-provincial ranks at the age of only 40. In 2004 he was named vice mayor of Beijing. In 2007, he was named executive vice mayor of Beijing. In June 2012, he was named Deputy Party Secretary of Beijing.

On January 25, 2013, Ji Lin was named Chairman of the Beijing Committee of the Chinese People's Political Consultative Conference. At the time he was the second youngest CPPCC provincial-level chair in the country, next to Nurlan Abilmazhinuly.

Ji is an alternate member of the 17th Central Committee of the Chinese Communist Party and the 18th Central Committee of the Chinese Communist Party.

References

1962 births
Chinese Communist Party politicians from Shanghai
Living people
Renmin University of China alumni
Deputy mayors of Beijing
People's Republic of China politicians from Shanghai
Alternate members of the 20th Central Committee of the Chinese Communist Party